Kwobrup is a small town in the Shire of Kent, in the Wheatbelt region of Western Australia. It is located on the Katanning to Nyabing branch line. The Kwobrup Reserve, north of the town, forms part of the Kwobrup-Badgebup Important Bird Area.

References

Towns in Western Australia